Watle is a surname. Notable people with the surname include:

 Arne Watle, Norwegian businessperson
 Per Arne Watle (born 1948), Norwegian businessperson and politician
 Sarita Watle (died after 1944), Spanish dancer, vedette, singer, and actor

See also
 Wątłe Błota, Poland